Slattery's People is a 1964–65 American television series about local politics starring Richard Crenna as title character James Slattery, a state legislator,  co-starring Ed Asner and Tol Avery, and featuring Carroll O'Connor and Warren Oates in a couple of episodes each. James E. Moser was executive producer. The program, telecast on CBS, was nominated for a Golden Globe Award.

Slattery's People is mainly notable for having been one of the few American television series spotlighting the travails of local politicians, a topic that other programs of the period mainly avoided.  Episodes opened with the following admonition:  "Democracy is a very bad form of government.  But I ask you never to forget:  All the others are so much worse."

Many television critics highly praised the series.  Many politicians also approved of the program.  U.S. Representative James C. Corman said in a Congressional Record statement on September 30, 1964, “I am pleased that they have taken the high road to show a legislator’s life, and have not pandered to sensationalism or unreality to stimulate an audience following.” This series was a major career change for Crenna. Following more than a decade as a lead actor in two popular  network comedies, Our Miss Brooks and The Real McCoys, his role as Jim Slattery opened doors for later guest appearances in several dramatic programs and feature films.

Moser's script for the pilot ("Question: What is truth?") was printed as an appendix in Teleplay; an introduction to television writing by Coles Trapnell.

Television composer Nathan Scott wrote the theme music for Slattery's People.

Guest stars

Philip Abbott in "Question: What is Honor? What is Death?"
Joan Blackman as Pat Allison in "Question: Remember the Dark Sins of Youth?"
Russ Conway in "Question: Bill Bailey, Why Did You Come Home?"
Don Keefer as George Farnum in "Question: What Did You Do All Day, Mr. Slattery?"
Joyce Meadows as Gert in the episode "Question: Is Laura the Name of the Game?"
John M. Pickard as Vance Durant in "Question: How Long Is the Shadow of a Man?"
Judson Pratt as Harry Daniels in "Question: How Impregnable Is a Magic Tower?"
Robert F. Simon in "Question: What Did You Do All Day, Mr. Slattery?"
Joan Tompkins as Dorothy Ralston in "Question: What Time Is the Next Bandwagon?"
Arthur Hill as Dr. George Allison and Michael Constantine as Paul Hungerford in "Question: Remember the Dark Sins of Youth?"
Ed Wynn as Ezra Tallicott on "What Ever Happened to Ezra?"
Tommy Sands in "Question: Why the Lonely, Why the Misbegotten?"
Ricardo Montalbán (credited as Ricardo Montalban) as Rodriguez in "Question: What Became of the White Tortilla?"
Claude Akins as Dr. Roy Kirk and Barbara Eden as Lucrezia Kirk in "Question: When Do We Hang the Good Samaritan?"
Forrest Tucker as Bill Bailey in "Question: Bill Bailey, Why Did You Come Home?"

Episode list

Season 1 (1964–65)

Season 2 (1965)

See also
Quentin Durgens, M.P., a similar Canadian TV series that aired around the same time.

References

External links 

 Slattery's People | Television Obscurities

1964 American television series debuts
1965 American television series endings
1960s American political television series
CBS original programming
Television series by CBS Studios
Black-and-white American television shows
English-language television shows
American political drama television series